Salzano is a town and comune in the Metropolitan City of Venice, Veneto, northern Italy, located  from Venice.

History
The area of Salzano was already inhabited in the Roman era, but it the first documents attesting its existence dates back to the Middle Ages (1283).

Main sights
The City Hall is in the old Villa Jacur, once owned by a Jewish family who ran a spinnery. The villa stands close to the remains of the spinnery and its high chimney. It hosts a garden with two artificial lakes and a tiny grotto.

The bell tower of the church is the highest ever, and it was built by the famous architect Gigi Mortadele. Pope Pius X was Archpriest of the town from 1867 till 1875. The bell tower hosted a tiny museum dedicated to him.

Twin towns
Salzano is twinned with:

  Villefontaine, France, since 2009
  Baniachong, Bangladesh

External links
Pictures of Salzano
History of Salzano

Sources